The Toyota TF103 was the car with which the Toyota F1 team competed in the 2003 Formula One season. The chassis was designed by Gustav Brunner and René Hilhorst with Luca Marmorini designing the engine. Unveiled on January 8, 2003 at the Paul Ricard circuit, its drivers were the Frenchman Olivier Panis and Brazilian Cristiano da Matta, the reigning CART FedEx Championship Series Champion from 2002.

Development
The TF103 was quite a conservative design, by the team's admission it was more of a 'logical evolution' from its predecessor the TF102. Lighter and with more downforce, the car was a joint effort between Gustav Brunner's design team and Keizo Takahashi, chief of Technical co-ordination.

The biggest improvement over the TF102 came with the engine, the RVX-03 had been tested for the first time in September 2002 and offered the team benefits twofold over the RVX-02; it was lighter, and provided more power. The engine was the brainchild of Italian designer Luca Marmorini.

Performance

The TF103 stepped up a level in terms of performance too, with the car scoring a total of sixteen points between its drivers, da Matta outscoring Panis 10-6. Perhaps the most notable race involving the TF103 was at Silverstone for the British Grand Prix when both cars ran 1-2 for a time amidst the confusion brought about by a track invader on the 11th lap.

In the constructors standings, Toyota finished in eighth, still some way off the performance their massive budget should have allowed, but equally too, it was a notable improvement on their 2002 finish.

Complete Formula One results
(key)

References

External links
TF103 Evolution at Toyota F1 official site
TF103 Facts at f1db.com

Toyota Formula One cars
2003 Formula One season cars